Khao Laem National Park is a park of about  1,500 square kilometers in western Thailand, located in the northern area of the Tenasserim Hills, Kanchanaburi Province. It is a part of the Western Forest Complex, a system of protected wilderness in the Dawna-Tenasserim Hills area of western Thailand.

The park surrounds the Khao Laem Reservoir in Kanchanaburi province about 340 km northwest of Bangkok. It is cut through by Road 323. The vegetation consists of mixed deciduous, hill evergreen and dry evergreen forest. It is adjacent to the Thungyai Naresuan Wildlife Sanctuary, which is situated to the northeast of Khao Laem National Park. Large animals of the area include tigers, elephants, gaurs, sambar deer, barking deer and wild boars.

The park hosted the second season of New Zealand version of Survivor entitled Survivor NZ: Thailand.

Geography 
The area of the park is 935,584 rai ~  with steeply limestone mountain run on north-south axis. It is located next to the Vajiralongkorn Reservoir.

Climate 
The area is in tropical climate which influenced by southern wind and Andaman sea wind and divided into three seasons as follows.

 The rainy season (June–October), heavy raining
 The cold season (November–January), the coldest temperature recorded was 10˚C
 The hot season (February–May), the hottest temperature record was 37-38˚C in April

Flora and fauna 
The park consists of mixed deciduous, hill evergreen and dry evergreen forest, which are the wildlife habitats of animals such as bears, tigers, elephants, sambar deers, barking deers, wild boars and birds.

See also
List of national parks of Thailand
List of Protected Areas Regional Offices of Thailand

References

External links 

 Description of Khao Laem National Park 
 Khao Laem National Park at westernforest.org 
 Interactive map of Khao Laem National Park at World Database on Protected Areas (UNEP and IUCN)
 Map of Khao Laem National Park

National parks of Thailand
Protected areas established in 1987
Geography of Kanchanaburi province
Tourist attractions in Kanchanaburi province
1987 establishments in Thailand
Dawna Range